Daniel Smith "Silent Danny" Cox (October 12, 1903 — August 8, 1982) was a professional ice hockey left winger who played 321 games in the National Hockey League between 1926 and 1934. He played for the Toronto St. Patricks, Toronto Maple Leafs, Ottawa Senators, Detroit Falcons, and New York Rangers. He spent the last several years of his playing career in the minor leagues, including serving as a player-coach in the Pacific Coast Hockey League, retiring in 1941. He was born in Little Current, Ontario.

Career statistics

Regular season and playoffs

External links 
 

1903 births
1982 deaths
Canadian ice hockey coaches
Canadian ice hockey left wingers
Detroit Falcons players
Hamilton Tigers (CPHL) players
Ice hockey people from Ontario
Minneapolis Millers (CHL) players
New York Rangers players
Ottawa Senators (1917) players
People from Manitoulin Island
Philadelphia Ramblers players
Quebec Castors players
Seattle Olympics players
Seattle Seahawks (ice hockey) players
Toronto Maple Leafs players
Toronto St. Pats players
Wichita Skyhawks players